Héctor García (born 11 December 1926) was an Argentine boxer. He competed in the men's middleweight event at the 1948 Summer Olympics. At the 1948 Summer Olympics, he lost to Johnny Wright of Great Britain.

References

External links
  

1926 births
Possibly living people
Argentine male boxers
Olympic boxers of Argentina
Boxers at the 1948 Summer Olympics
Place of birth missing
Middleweight boxers